The 1987–88 Superliga Juvenil de Fútbol season was the second since its establishment.

League table

See also
1988 Copa del Rey Juvenil

External links
 Royal Spanish Football Federation website
Arquero-Arba Futbolme

1987
Juvenil